Francesco Palliola, SJ (May 10, 1612 – January 29, 1648) was an Italian Jesuit priest and missionary in Mindanao, Philippines. Due to his missionary work and faith healings, the Diocese of Dipolog opened a cause for martyrdom on January 6, 2016, and was formally closed in September 2017 by Bishop Severo Caermare at the Our Lady of the Most Holy Rosary Cathedral in Dipolog City.

The Vatican's Congregation for the Causes of Saints has declared as valid the investigation into the sainthood cause for a 16th-century Jesuit missionary who served in Mindanao.

Early life

Padre Francesco was born on 10 May 1612 in Nola, Naples, Italy.

Death

Palliola was on his way home from Sindangan to Dapitan while riding a horse when a certain bandit, a converted native named Tampilo, carrying a long bolo suddenly appeared, attacked, and beheaded him leading to his demise. The priest's body was then buried along the wide stretch of a beach at Sitio Tabang near the townsite and is still present today.

References

1612 births
1648 deaths
Filipino Servants of God
Italian Servants of God
17th-century Italian Jesuits
Jesuit missionaries
Italian expatriates in the Philippines
17th-century Neapolitan people
Italian Roman Catholic missionaries
Roman Catholic missionaries in the Philippines
17th-century venerated Christians
17th-century Roman Catholic martyrs